Shanghai Forte Land Company Limited (former stock codes: HKEX:2337), or Shanghai Forte Land and Forte Land, is one of the largest real estate developers in Shanghai, China. It is founded by Chinese billionaire Guo Guangchang in 1994 and it is headquartered in Shanghai. It has developed several dozens of real estate projects in major cities such as Shanghai, Beijing, Wuhan, Nanjing, Wuxi, Chongqing, Tianjin, Haikou and Hangzhou.

Forte's H shares were listed on the Hong Kong Stock Exchange in 2004. It was planned to issue A shares in the Shanghai Stock Exchange in 2008. Forte was acquired and privatized by Fosun International in May 2011.

See also
Real estate in China

References

External links
Shanghai Forte Land

H shares
Real estate companies of China
Civilian-run enterprises of China
Companies based in Shanghai
Real estate companies established in 1994
Fosun International
Companies formerly listed on the Hong Kong Stock Exchange